The 1952 United States presidential election in Georgia took place on November 4, 1952, as part of the 1952 United States presidential election. Georgia voters chose 12 representatives, or electors, to the Electoral College, who voted for president and vice president.

Georgia was won by Adlai Stevenson (D–Illinois), running with Alabama Senator John Sparkman, with 69.66% of the popular vote, against Columbia University President Dwight D. Eisenhower (R–New York), running with Senator Richard Nixon, with 30.34% of the popular vote.

Results

Results by county

Notes

References

Georgia
1952
1952 Georgia (U.S. state) elections